Sadova is a commune in Dolj County, Oltenia, Romania. It is composed of two villages, Piscu Sadovei and Sadova.

Damian village, a separate commune from 1864 to 1908 and from 1923 to 1950, was also part of Sadova Commune from 1908 to 1922 and from 1950 to 1968, when it was abolished.

References

Communes in Dolj County
Localities in Oltenia